Carbon Power Plant, also known as Castle Gate Power Plant was a small, 190-MWe coal-fired power station in Utah, USA operated by PacifiCorp. Its units 1 and 2, rated at 75 and 113.6 MWe, were launched into service in 1954 and 1957.

The plant was shut down on April 16, 2015 and was demolished in 2016.

Environmental impact

Summary

References

Buildings and structures in Carbon County, Utah
Coal-fired power stations in Utah
Energy infrastructure completed in 1954
Energy infrastructure completed in 1957
Former coal-fired power stations in the United States
Former power stations in Utah